{{Infobox book
| name              = Azul
| pub_date          = 1888
| image             = Azul - Primera edición.JPG
| author            = Rubén Darío
| caption           = The cover of Azuls first edition
}}Azul''''' is a collection of short stories and poetry by Nicaraguan poet Rubén Darío. It was published in 1888 as Darío's first major work and a major work of the Modernismo literary movement.

Content and reception

References 

Spanish books
1888 short story collections
Spanish-language books